The Backrooms is an online urban legend originating from a creepypasta posted on a 2019 4chan thread. One of the most well-known examples of the Internet aesthetic of liminal spaces, which depicts usually busy locations as unnaturally empty, the Backrooms was first described as a maze of empty office rooms that can only be entered by "noclipping out of reality".

As its popularity grew, internet users expanded upon the original concept by creating different levels and entities which inhabit the Backrooms. Fan-made video games, collaborative fiction wikis and YouTube videos have also been created: a series of horror shorts created by YouTuber Kane Pixels in 2022 is credited with popularizing Backrooms content on the platform, and he is slated to direct a film adaptation of his Backrooms videos.

Original creepypasta

On May 12, 2019, an anonymous user started a thread on /x/, 4chan's paranormal-themed board, asking users to "post disquieting images that just feel 'off. One of the posts was the original photo of the Backrooms: a picture of a large carpeted, open room with yellow wallpaper and fluorescent lighting on a Dutch angle. It is not known where the photo was taken. 

Another user replied to this post with the first description of the Backrooms:

Impact and fandom 

As the creepypasta grew in popularity, users began to share stories about the Backrooms on subreddits such as r/creepypasta and later r/backrooms. A fandom began to develop around the Backrooms and creators expanded upon the original iteration of the creepypasta by creating additional floors or "levels" and entities which populate them. Happy Mag noted in particular two other levels: Level 1, a level with industrial architecture, and Level 2, a darkly lit level with long service tunnels, with the original version named Level 0. 

As new levels were devised in r/backrooms, a faction of fans who preferred the original Backrooms split off from the fandom. A Reddit user named Litbeep created another subreddit called r/TrueBackrooms focusing only on the original version. ABC News said that unlike fandoms surrounding existing properties, the lack of a canonical Backrooms made "drawing a line between authentic storytelling and jokes" difficult. It grouped the Backrooms into an "emerging genre of collaborative online horror" which also included the SCP Foundation. Wikis hosted on Fandom and Wikidot dedicated to the Backrooms lore were established. By March 2022, r/backrooms had over 157,000 members.

Dan Erickson, creator of the television series Severance (2022), named the Backrooms as one of his many influences while working on the series.

Reception 

Some sources state the Backrooms was the origin of liminal spaces, an internet aesthetic which depicts usually busy locations as unnaturally empty. The #liminalspaces hashtag has amassed nearly 100 million views on the social media platform TikTok. A TikTok trend of videos that zoom in on Google Earth to reveal an entrance to the Backrooms have grown popular. Other sources describe the Backrooms as only a subgenre of the aesthetic.

PC Gamer compared the Backrooms' various levels to H. P. Lovecraft's R'lyeh and The City in the manga Blame!, describing it as "an uncanny valley of place". ABC News and Le Monde have compared it to the SCP Foundation, a similar creepypasta. Professor Tama Leaver of Curtin University said that "these sort of memes work so well because they invite you to interpret what's not shown", believing that the "eerie feeling of familiarity" conjured by the Backrooms helped draw fans together.

Adaptations

YouTube
In January 2022, a short horror film titled The Backrooms (Found Footage) was uploaded to YouTube. Created by then 16-year-old Kane Parsons of Northern California, known online as Kane Pixels, it is presented as a VHS tape recorded by a filmmaker who accidentally enters the Backrooms in the 1990s and is pursued by a monster. Parsons used the software Blender and Adobe After Effects to create the environment of the Backrooms, and it took him a month to complete it. He described the Backrooms as a manifestation of a poorly remembered recollection of the late 90s and early 2000s. The video has over 46 million views . 

The short was praised by the fandom and received positive reviews from critics. WPST called it "the scariest video on the Internet". Otaku USA categorized it as analog horror, while Dread Central and Nerdist compared it favorably to the 2019 video game Control. Boing Boings Rob Beschizza predicted that the Backrooms, like the creepypasta Slender Man and its panned 2018 film adaptation, would eventually be adapted into a "slick but dismal 2-hour Hollywood movie." 

Expanding his videos into a series of sixteen shorts, Parsons introduced plot aspects such as ASYNC, an organization which opened a portal into the Backrooms in the 1980s. The series has collectively garnered over 100 million views. PC Gamer said Parsons caused "a kind of Backrooms revival", and Backrooms content largely became popular on YouTube as a result of his series. For his shorts, Parsons received a Creator Honors at the 2022 Streamy Awards from The Game Theorists.

Film adaptation 
On February 6, 2023, A24 announced that they are working on a film adaptation of the Backrooms, with Parsons set to direct over his summer vacation. Roberto Patino is set to write the screenplay, while James Wan, Michael Clear from Atomic Monster, Shawn Levy, Dan Cohen, and Dan Levine of 21 Laps are set to produce.

Video games 
The Backrooms have been adapted into numerous video games, including on the platforms Steam and Roblox. An indie game was released by Pie on a Plate Productions two months after the original creepypasta, and was positively reviewed for its atmosphere but received criticism for its short length. Many others, such as Enter the Backrooms, Noclipped and The Backrooms Project, were released in the following years. Co-op multiplayer Escape the Backrooms by Fancy Games was praised by Bloody Disgusting for its depiction of the extended lore, while The Backrooms 1998 (both 2022), a psychological survival horror game independently released by one-person developer Steelkrill Studio, was noted by reviewers for its found footage visuals and limited save system.

See also
 List of creepypastas

Notes

References

Further reading

External links 

 Original thread on 4chan (archived)
 
 Kane Pixels on YouTube

Creepypasta
Internet memes introduced in 2019
Internet properties established in 2019
Science fiction horror
4chan phenomena
Nostalgia
Fictional locations
Works of unknown authorship